Pistolet maszynowy dywersyjny (often abbreviated p.m.d., literally: Machine pistol, diversionary) is a name applied to a Polish prototype compact submachine gun or machine pistol design. As the name suggests, the weapon was intended as a light-weight, small and reliable firearm intended as a primary weapon of sabotage squads. The basic requirements for such a weapon were drawn by February 1939, the prototype was to be completed by November of that year by the Instytut Techniczny Uzbrojenia institute. The weapon was to use 7.63 x 25mm Mauser cartridges. However, the outbreak of World War II prevented the completion of the prototype and it never left the drawing boards. Because of that, it never received official military designation and is referred to in literature by its descriptive name rather than a proper name.

References

Bibliography 
  

1939 establishments in Poland
Submachine guns of Poland